Premer Taj Mahal also is a Bangladeshi Bengali-language film. It was released in January 2002 in Bangladesh. It was directed by Gazi Mahbub and written by Gazi Jahangir. It was produced by Mohammad Jashim Uddin and distributed by Riya Kothachitra. The film is a family drama telling a deep love story. Stars include Riaz, Shabnur, Wasimul Bari Rajib, Abul Hayat, Misha Sawdagar, Anowar Hossain, Rawshan Zamil, Rasheda Chowdhury, and Afzal Sharif.

Plot
Robyn (Riaz) and Liza (Shabnur) are in love. However, they are shown as unaware they come from the same background. Additionally, their disparate religions obstructed their matrimony; Robyn is a Muslim and Liza is a Christian. When they take a step toward a love marriage, Liza goes to Church. She is shocked to learn that Robyn is Muslim, while Robyn is shocked to learn she is Christian. They separate and try to forget each other. Instead they are soon together again, determined to stay. Their families learn about this situation and take action. Robyn's father Raihan Chowdhury (Abul Hayat) and Liza's father Abraham Dikosta (Wasimul Bari Rajib) start a conflict due to previous business relations.

The final plot twist  shows that Liza is not Abraham Dikosta's daughter. She was born in a Muslim family and her birth father is "Abdul Rahim" (Anowar Hossain). One day, Abdul Rahim's and Abraham Dikosta's full families cross a river on a ferry. A cyclone spills everyone into the water. The survivors search for their family members. Meanwhile, Dikosta finds Rahim's baby named Alo. He takes Alo with him. Abdul Rahim knows that Alo is alive. After many years, Abdul Rahim encounters Dikosta accidentally. Afterwards, everybody learns the truth and Robyn and Liza marry.

Cast
 Riaz as Robyn Chowdhury
 Shabnur as Liza Dikosta (Alo)
 Wasimul Bari Rajib as Abraham Dikosta
 Abul Hayat as Raihan Chowdhury
 Rawshan Zamil as Liza's Grand Mother
 Rasheda Chowdhury as Robyn's Mother
 Afzal Sharif as Mintu
 Misha Sawdagar as Diferson Dikosta
 Neela as Neela
 Anowar Hossain as Abdur Rahim
 Nasrin as Special appearance
 Dulari Chakraborty
 Nimara Karim Risha

Music
Premier Taj Mahal film's music is directed by Bangladeshi lyricist and composer Ahmed Imtiaz Bulbul. Monir Khan and Kanak Chapa won the National Film Awards for singer of the year in 2002. The song was "Ei Buke Boichhe Jamuna".

Soundtrack

Awards
Premer Taj Mahal films won National Film Awards total of three categories in the year 2001:
 Best Music Director: Ahmed Imtiaz Bulbul, for the song Ei Buke Boichhe Jamuna.2001
 Best Male Playback Singer: Monir Khan, for the song Ei Buke Boichhe Jamuna.2001
 Best Female Playback singer: Kanak Chapa, for the song Ei Buke Boichhe Jamuna 2001

References

External links
 

2002 films
2002 romantic drama films
Bengali-language Bangladeshi films
Bangladeshi romantic drama films
Films scored by Ahmed Imtiaz Bulbul
2000s Bengali-language films